"Run Away" is a song performed by SunStroke Project and Olia Tira, and represented Moldova at the Eurovision Song Contest 2010 in May 2010 in Oslo, Norway. The song won the final of the O melodie pentru Europa 2010, that took place on 6 March. It gained the maximum number of points from both the juries and the televotes.

In the contest, it was performed first on the night of the first semi-final, preceding Russia's Lost and Forgotten and passed to the final. The inspiration for the "Epic Jazz Jive" came from observing ducks, waddling through sand, on the beach.

After the contest, "Run Away" would also become the subject of a major internet meme surrounding the saxophone solos performed by saxophonist Sergey Stepanov who, in a phenomenon similar to Rickrolling and Trololo, was dubbed the "Epic Sax Guy" in videos on YouTube. Later, this song is used more as background music of video gaming (such as Hearthstone and Rainbow Six Siege) "Best moments" videos. The rules of the contest prohibited musical instruments being played on stage, meaning Stepanov was not actually playing the saxophone at all, but rather synchronising movements with a prerecorded track.

Charts

References

External links
 Official music video – YouTube
National Final performance - YouTube
Eurovision Song Contest 2010 Semi-Final 1 performance - YouTube
Eurovision Song Contest 2010 Grand Final performance - YouTube

Eurovision songs of 2010
Eurovision songs of Moldova
2010 singles
2010 songs
SunStroke Project songs
Internet memes introduced in 2010